My Story is an autobiographical book written by Ronnie Kray.  He, along with his twin brother Reggie, were said to be some of the most feared gangsters in British history.

Originally published in hardback 1993 by Sidgwick & Jackson, it was re-published in paperback on 7 October 1994 by Pan Books part of Macmillan Publishers.

Synopsis
This book is the follow-up to the jointly written Our Story (1988) by both Ronnie and Reggie Kray.

In My Story, Ronnie describes in his own words the murders of Jack "the Hat" McVitie and George Cornell, his bisexuality, and his feelings about spending 11 years in Parkhurst followed by his later years in Broadmoor Hospital for the criminally insane. Also included is a chapter written by Ronnie's wife, Kate Kray, and 21 photographs depicting the young Krays, their family, friends, and victims.

Quote from book: "They were the best years of our lives. They called them the swinging Sixties. The Beatles and The Rolling Stones were the rulers of pop music, Carnaby Street ruled the fashion world... and me and my brother ruled London. We were fucking untouchable..." - Ronnie Kray.

References

External links
British Library Integrated Catalogue - My Story Ron Kray
Official Krays website
The Kray Twins, Biography Channel
Encyclopædia Britannica - Ronnie Kray
http://www.gangland.net/kraybooks.htm  Gangland.net Kray books

1993 non-fiction books
Organized crime memoirs
Memoirs of imprisonment
British autobiographies
Works about the Kray twins
Sidgwick & Jackson books